There Was an Old Couple is a 1965 Soviet drama film directed by Grigori Chukhrai. It was entered into the 1965 Cannes Film Festival.

Cast
 Ivan Marin as The Old Man, Gusakov
 Vera Kuznetsova as The Old Woman, Gusakova
 Lyudmila Maksakova as Nina
 Georgy Martyniuk as Valentin
 Galina Polskikh  as Galya
 Anatoli Yabbarov as Sectarian
 Viktor Kolpakov as Paramedic
 Nikolai Kryuchkov as Director of the Sovkhoz
 Nikolai Sergeyev as Accountant
 Giuli Chokhonelidze as Engineer
 Yelena Derzhavina as Irochka (as Lenochka Derzhavina)
 Nikolay Khlibko as episode

References

External links

1965 films
1965 drama films
1960s Russian-language films
Soviet black-and-white films
Films directed by Grigori Chukhrai
Soviet drama films